Pillarisation (from the ) is the politico-denominational segregation of a society into groups by religion and associated political beliefs. These societies were (and in some areas, still are) vertically divided into two or more  groups known as pillars (Dutch: zuilen). The best-known examples of this have historically occurred in the Netherlands and Belgium.

Each pillar may have its own social institutions and social organizations. These may include its own newspapers, broadcasting organisations, political parties, trade unions, farmers' associations, banks, stores, schools, hospitals, universities, scouting organisations and sports clubs. Such segregation means that many people have little or no personal contact with members of other pillars.

Netherlands

The Netherlands had at least three pillars, namely Protestant, Catholic and social-democratic. Pillarisation was originally initiated by Abraham Kuyper and his Christian Democratic and neo-Calvinist (gereformeerd) Anti-Revolutionary Party (ARP) in the late 19th century; it was part of its philosophy of sphere sovereignty.

The Catholic pillar had the highest degree of organisation, because Catholic clergy promoted the organisation of Catholics in confessional institutions. Yet, the conservative Protestant pillar and the Socialist pillar, which mainly consisted of industrial workers, were nearly as tightly knit. The Protestant (hervormd) Christian Historical Union (CHU) (formed in 1908) did not organise a pillar of its own but linked to the Protestant pillar shaped by the ARP.

People who were not associated with one of these pillars, mainly middle- and upper-class latitudinarian Protestants and atheists, arguably set up their own pillar: the liberal or "general" pillar. Ties between general organisations were much weaker than within the other three pillars. Liberals rejected the voluntary segregation of the society, and denied the existence of a "liberal pillar". The political parties usually associated with this group were the Free-minded Democratic League (VDB) and Liberal State Party (LSP). Communists, Humanists, and ultra-orthodox Protestant fundamentalists also set up similar organisations; however, such groups were much smaller.

The development of pillarisation in the Netherlands was favoured by the emancipation of working and lower-middle classes on the one hand, and the execution of elite control on the other hand. The emancipation of the working class led to the establishment of socialist parties, trade unions, media, cooperative shops and collectively organised leisure activities. This "full care" of the socialist movement for its members existed similarly in other European countries. The emancipation of the conservative and often strongly religious lower-middle class fostered the emergence of the Protestant pillar. While the Dutch bourgeoisie was rather liberal and adhered to "enlightened" Protestantism, a large part of the lower-middle class embraced a more orthodox Calvinist theology, as taught by preacher and politician Abraham Kuyper.

In 1866 Kuyper founded the gereformeerd ("reformed") current of Protestantism; it was both more conservative and more popular with ordinary people than the established Protestant churches in the Netherlands. Kuyper's worldview asserted the principle of "sphere sovereignty", rejecting both ecclesiasticism (rule of the Church over all parts of the society) and statist secularism (rule of the state over all parts of the society). He argued that both had their own spheres in which the other was not to interfere. In 1879 he founded the Anti-Revolutionary Party as the political wing of his religious movement and core of the Protestant pillar.

At the same time, new and old elites tried to maintain their control over the newly emancipated social groups. For instance, the Catholic clergy set up confessional unions to prevent Catholic workers from joining socialist unions. One reason behind the formation of Christian parties was to counter the feared rise of left-wing mass parties.

Institutions by pillar
The following table shows the most important institutions by pillar:

Depillarisation
After World War II (during which even the Dutch resistance was pillarised) liberals and socialists, but also Protestants and Catholics, began to doubt the pillarised system. They founded a unity movement, the People's Movement Nederlandse Volksbeweging. Progressives of all pillars (including the Catholic resistance movement Christofoor) were united in the aim to renew the political system (doorbraak, "breakthrough"). But pillarisation was ingrained in Dutch society, and could not be defeated that easily. In order to force this breakthrough, the socialist Social Democratic Workers' Party, the left-liberal VDB and the Christian-socialist CDU united to form the PvdA, a progressive party, which was open to all people. The new party did not, however, gain enough support under Catholics or Reformed, and the PvdA became encapsulated in the socialist pillar.

Television broadcasting was also pillarised, but everyone watched the same broadcasts nonetheless, since initially only one channel was available in the Netherlands in the 1950s. During the 1960s the pillars largely broke down, particularly under political criticism from D66 and the group  (New Left) in PvdA. Because of this and of increased mobility, many people could see that people from the other pillars were not that different from themselves. Increased wealth and education made people independent of many of the pillarised institutions, and young people did not want to be associated with these organisations anymore.

In 1973, two main Protestant parties, ARP and CHU, merged with the Catholic KVP to form the Christian Democratic Appeal (CDA). They first participated in the 1977 general elections. In 1976, the Catholic trade union  (NKV) started to cooperate with the trade union of the Socialist pillar (NVV), to merge into the Federatie Nederlandse Vakbeweging (FNV) in 1982.

The pillarisation of society has not fully disappeared, and many remnants can still be seen in the 21st century: public television, for instance, is still divided among several organisations, instead of being one organisation. The Netherlands has both public and religious schools, a divide which is also inherited from pillarisation. Moreover, some communities continue to behave as small "pillars" , although rather than forming the structure of society (a pillar), this currently moves them outside the mainstream of society. Members of the Reformed Churches (liberated) have their own (primary and secondary) schools, their own national newspaper, and some other organisations, such as a labour union. Members of several pietist Reformed Churches have also founded their own schools, newspaper and political party. Increasingly, Muslim immigrants in the Netherlands are also using the legal possibilities created for the pillarised structure of society, by setting up their own schools.

Belgium

Apart from having no Protestant pillar, pillarisation in Belgium was very similar to that in Netherlands. There was also no "general" pillar, but a politically well-organised liberal pillar. In 1911, the British sociologist Seebohm Rowntree noted that in Belgium:

In both Flanders and Wallonia, societies were pillarised between Catholic and Liberal political denominations which were subsequently joined by a Socialist pillar. Even though the liberals were stronger in Belgium (particularly in Brussels) than in the Netherlands, they were still relatively weak, owing to their rather small, bourgeois support: liberal trade unions were very small. De Tijd, a financial daily, is the newspaper aligned with the liberals, as its readership consists mainly of liberal supporters. However, a Flemish newspaper with historical liberal roots, Het Laatste Nieuws, also exists.

Denominational (many Catholic and a few Jewish) schools receive some public money, although not parity of funding as in the Netherlands, so that tuition is almost completely free. Belgian universities charge more or less the same, relatively low, tuition fees.

As a consequence of the language struggle in the latter half of the twentieth century, the pillars split over the language issue, which became the most significant divisive factor in the nation. Now every language group has three pillars of its own. The pillar system remained to be the primordial societal dividing force much longer than it was in the Netherlands. Only near the end of the Cold War did it begin to lose importance, at least at the individual level, and to this day it continues to influence Belgian society. For example, even the 1999–2003 "Rainbow Coalition" of Guy Verhofstadt was often rendered with the terms of pillarisation. The political movements that appeared in the late 20th century (such as Vlaams Blok, now Vlaams Belang; Groen!; and N-VA) did not attempt to build pillars.

Pillarisation was visible even in everyday social organisations such as musical ensembles, sport clubs, recreational facilities, etc. Weakened in the current situation, many major social organisations (trade unions, cooperatives, etc.) still strictly follow the lines of pillars though.

Institutions by pillar with their ethnic divisions
The following table is limited to the most important institutions and it shows the current division of everyone by the three ethnic groups.

Proporz in Austria

The Austrian version of Verzuiling is the long-standing Proporz doctrine (a hypocorism for Proportionalität, German for 'proportionality'). This was first only within the politics of the second Austrian republic, but later degenerated into a neo-corporatist system of patronage and nepotism pervading many aspects of Austrian life. The Proporz was created, developed and promoted by the two mainstream parties, the Catholic Austrian People's Party (ÖVP) and the Social-Democratic Socialist Party of Austria (since 1991 Social Democratic Party of Austria, both names with the acronym of SPÖ).

This de facto two-party system collapsed with the elections of 1999, which resulted in the joining of the national-conservative Freedom Party of Austria (FPÖ), whose political marginalisation and that of its predecessor, the Federation of Independents (VdU), was the main reason for the establishment of the Proporz policy, because of their pro-German, far right and individualist views.

The Proporz system arose out of the need for balanced, consensual governance in the early years of Austria's second republic. At that time, the country was consumed in an effort to rebuild the country after the devastation of World War II. Thus, the doctrine of Proporz is intimately linked to the idea of the grand coalition, in which the major political parties, in the case of post-war Austria the SPÖ and the ÖVP, share in the government.

Like in the Netherlands or in Belgium the main parties have partly to this day, "black" and "red" parallel organizations, e.g. B. at touring clubs (ÖAMTC vs. ARBÖ), factions inside the Austrian Trade Union Federation (FCG vs. FSG vs. Freiheitlichen Arbeitnehmer (FPÖ)) or sports associations (Sportunion vs. ASKÖ).

Italy
A similar phenomena existed during the First Italian Republic.

There are multiple trade unions: Italian Confederation of Workers' Trade Unions (CISL) which was close Christian Democracy (DC), Italian General Confederation of Labour (CGIL), close to Italian Communist Party (PCI), General Labour Union, allied to the Italian Social Movement (MSI) and the Italian Labour Union which had ties Italian Republican Party (PRI) and Italian Democratic Socialist Party (PSDI).

The state-owned public broadcaster RAI was split between the parties too. Rai 1 was said to be close to DC, Rai 2 was said to be close to PSI and Rai 3 to PCI.

Northern Ireland

The term "pillarisation" has also been used to describe segregation of the two main ethnoreligious groups in Northern Ireland, especially between the foundation of Northern Ireland (1922) and the end of The Troubles (1969–1998); segregation and pillarisation persist but are declining. A difference in Northern Ireland is that one group (the Protestant–Unionist–Loyalist population) enjoyed clear political, economic and social dominance over the other group (the Catholics–nationalist–republicans). This has been described as pillarisation "without consociationalism."

Especially since the Belfast Agreement (1998), efforts have been made to break down segregation. "Cross-community" political parties such as the Alliance Party, Green Party and People Before Profit exist, and a growing number of people who identify and vote as "other," rather than for "Catholic" or "Protestant" identities, as well as growing numbers of atheists; but elections are often derided as a "sectarian head-count," with growing Protestant anxiety over the possibility of a Catholic majority. Historically, other non-sectarian political parties also operated, most notably the Northern Ireland Labour Party and the Northern Ireland Women's Coalition.

See also

 Balkanization
 Consociationalism
 Identity politics
 Millet (Ottoman Empire)
 Sectarianism
 Social environment
 Sui iuris
 Test Act
 Political particularism

References

Further reading
 
 
 
 Christophe de Voogd: "Histoire des Pays-Bas des origines à nos jours", Fayard, Paris, 2004

Social history of Belgium
Political history of Belgium
Social history of the Netherlands
Political history of the Netherlands
Christian democracy
Identity politics
Segregation